Louise Doughty is the author of nine novels, five plays for radio and a TV mini-series.  Her most recent book is Platform Seven (2019), currently being adapted as a four-part drama. The previous book, Black Water, (2016) was nominated as one of the New York Times Notable Books of the Year and the book before that was the bestseller Apple Tree Yard (2013), which has been published or is being translated into thirty languages and adapted into a highly successful television series adapted by Amanda Coe for BBC One starring Emily Watson. 

In her first original drama for television, Doughty wrote the three-part thriller Crossfire, about a gun attack on a holiday resort, made by Dancing Ledge Productions for BBC One. It stars Keeley Hawes and is due for broadcast on 20, 21 and 22 September 2022. She is also an executive producer on the series.

She is an executive producer on the television adaptation of Platform Seven, adapted by Paula Milne and currently in pre-production with Dancing Ledge Productions for ITV.

Her third novel, Honey-Dew, is under option with Chapter One pictures and she is working on a series outline.

Biography
Doughty was born on 4 September 1963 in Melton Mowbray and grew up in Oakham, Rutland. She attended Oakham School and is an alumna of Leeds University and of the University of East Anglia. She has lectured and contributed on creative writing in several countries of the world.

Doughty has written novels, non-fiction and plays for radio. She has worked as a cultural critic for newspapers and magazines.  Her weekly column for The Daily Telegraph was published as A Novel in a Year in 2007. Doughty was the presenter of the BBC Radio 4 programme A Good Read in 1998 to 2001.

In 2013, her seventh novel entitled Apple Tree Yard, was published and became a number one bestseller, selling over half a million copies in the UK alone. It has also been translated in thirty territories worldwide. A four-part television adaptation of the same name was broadcast on BBC One in January 2017. The series, which starred Emily Watson in the lead role, received widespread critical acclaim and consolidated viewing figures of 7 million per episode, making it the most-viewed new BBC drama at that time since The Night Manager.

Doughty now lives in London.

Awards and honours
Doughty's sixth novel, Whatever You Love, was short-listed for the Costa Book Award for fiction in 2010, and long-listed for the Orange Prize in 2011.

Her seventh novel, Apple Tree Yard, was selected as a Richard & Judy Book Choice in the spring of 2014. Hilary Mantel commented on the novel, "There can’t be a woman alive who hasn't once realised, in a moment of panic, that she's in the wrong place at the wrong time with the wrong man. Louise Doughty... leads her unnerved reader into dark territory. A compelling and bravely written book."

Her short story "Fat White Cop with Ginger Eyebrows" was long-listed for the 2015 Sunday Times EFG Private Bank Short Story Award.

Louise Doughty is a Fellow of the Royal Society of Literature. In 2019, she received an honorary doctorate (D.Litt.) from the University of East Anglia.

Selected works

Novels
Doughty, Louise (1995). Crazy Paving. Simon & Schuster Ltd. 
Doughty, Louise (1996). Dance with Me (1996). Simon & Schuster Ltd. 
Doughty, Louise (1998). Honey-Dew. Simon & Schuster Ltd. 
Doughty, Louise (2003). Fires in the Dark. Simon & Schuster Ltd. 
Doughty, Louise (2006). Stone Cradle. Simon & Schuster Ltd. 
Doughty, Louise (2010). Whatever You Love. Faber and Faber. 
Doughty, Louise (2013). Apple Tree Yard. Faber and Faber. 
Doughty, Louise (2016). Black Water. Faber and Faber. 
Doughty, Louise (2019). Platform Seven. Faber and Faber.

Non-fiction
Doughty, Louise (2007). A Novel in a Year. Simon & Schuster Ltd.

Radio Plays

References

External links

2012 interview at The Guardian

1963 births
Living people
Alumni of the University of Leeds
Alumni of the University of East Anglia
English Romani people
English dramatists and playwrights
English women journalists
English women novelists
People educated at Oakham School
People from the Borough of Melton
People from Oakham
Romani writers
English women dramatists and playwrights
British people of Romani descent
British Romani people
English women non-fiction writers